José Menéndez Menéndez (1846–1918) was a Spanish businessman based in Argentina and Chilean Patagonia. He was the initiator of large companies that remain to this day.

Twenty-first century scholarship has uncovered the history of Menéndez and his business partners in the Braun family in the genocide of the Selk'nam people of Patagonia.

Biography

Early years
Menéndez was born in Santo Domingo de Miranda (Avilés), Spain, on November 2, 1846. Second child of seven, the marriage of Manuel Menéndez Cañedo and Alvarez, and María Menéndez Granda, peasants of modest means. The field work prevented him from receiving formal education, but managed to acquire the rudiments of literacy and numeracy, thanks to his maternal uncle Joseph who was a teacher. At a young age he left his homeland in search of opportunity in America, after passing through the island of Cuba, until finally settling in Argentina.

In 1866 José Menéndez Menéndez arrived in Buenos Aires. He was employed as a bookkeeper in signatures Corti Riva y Cia. and then Etchart and Co. firm. These jobs familiarized him with the shipping business, a sector that years later would develop in Patagonia, where he worked as a merchant, businessman and cattle shipping.

Marriage and family
On March 19, 1873, he married María Behety Chapital, born on May 24, 1848, in Montevideo, the daughter of the French Basque couple Félix Behety and María Chapital. The wedding was held at the Church of La Merced, Buenos Aires, a city where the family settled for a while. Menéndez had nine children: Alexander and Josephine, born in Buenos Aires; Jose, Julio and Maria, born in Punta Arenas. María died as an infant of pulmonary ailments. Mary (II), Alfonso, Charles and Herminia, were born in Punta Arenas. Josephine married Maurice Braun,  a businessman and associate of Jose Menéndez, and Charles, a lawyer, married to Cristina García González Bonorino. Mary married businessman Francisco Campos Torreblanca.

During the military revolt in Punta Arenas known as the Mutiny of the Gunners (1877), the city suffered damage and acts of barbarism. Among the acts committed, is the loss of a leg to gangrene by Maria Behety because of a wound by a stray bullet in the forest, amputated by a doctor who had fled the city with them.

In Patagonia

In 1874 José Menéndez moved to Punta Arenas, Chile, which later became his residence and base of their core business. In 1876, he began the business of sheep farming, carrying sheep from the Falkland Islands, under the company "José Menéndez and Co." and the Estancia San Gregorio, now historic site of the Chilean commune, under the same name.

In September 1892 the steamship Amadeo arrived in Punta Arenas on its maiden voyage, carrying bricks to build the family home. It was the first of the ships of their property. The Amadeus has been declared a National Monument by the Chilean Government, and its remains are on the beaches of the bay of San Gregorio (Chile), on the Strait of Magellan.

In 1894 José Menéndez traveled with the Salesian Father José María Beauvoir to land south of the Rio Grande, in the Argentine territory. Later, in 1896, founded the First Estancia of Argentina of  that he bought from the Argentinian Government. Currently this is Estancia José Menéndez, located 17 km. southwest of the Rio Grande. Jose Menendez founded a new branch of his business house in the city of Rio Gallegos, and shortly thereafter in Santa Cruz.

In 1893 he participated in the first group of shareholders of the Sociedad Explotadora de Tierra del Fuego (SETF), where he owned 200 shares and a share of over 15%. The Society set up a sheep empire that spanned much of Patagonia. Their main remnant is the Cold Storage Plant of Bories, located in Puerto Bories, now converted into a hotel.

In Punta Arenas, they opened many of the houses and buildings including a theater.

Later, in 1897, he opened a second venture livestock, after the success he had obtained in Estancia "Primera Argentina", he created the "Second Argentina". Currently Estancia María Behety, located 15 km. northwest of the city of Rio Grande, where in 1935 he built the shearing shed still "the largest of the world".

In 1903, he bought land adjacent to Gregory Bay on the Strait of Magallanes. That way, he owned 430,000 hectares in Tierra del Fuego.

After becoming and seen as one of the greatest landowners then began new business, among many others, bought the mine Loreto, to Agustin Ross, created the fat-rendering and manufacturing of packaged meat in the great factory of Jose Menendez, base of the "Sociedad Explotadora de Tierra del Fuego", increased its maritime fleet well, started a stimulus for the creation of roads and highways in the south organized banks and colonized vast southern regions.

In 1907, due to the financial crisis was associated with Mauricio Braun, until then its main competitor and son, when he married Josefina Menéndez Behety.

In 1910, he founded the Company and Commercial Cattle Behety Menendez, based in Punta Arenas. And then he formed the company with Import and Export of Patagonia. Its activities included convenience stores, cattle farms and shipping fleet. In the 1960s cleared most of the assets of the society were cleared and gave impetus to the chain of supermarkets La Anonima with over one hundred branches throughout Patagonia and the central Argentina province of Buenos Aires. Late in the 20th century, the stock package focused on the heirs of the Mauricio Braun family.

Genocide of the Selk'nam people
In the 21st century, the Historical Truth Commission of 2008 and related scholarship uncovered the involvement of the Menéndez and Braun families in the genocide of the Selk'nam people, calling into question their laudable reputation.

Death
José Menéndez died on April 24, 1918, at age 71 in Buenos Aires, where he owned residence. He was buried in the cemetery in Punta Arenas.

References

Martinic Beros, Mateo. Menéndez y Braun, prohombres patagónicos. Edition of Universidad de Magallanes. pp. 433. Consulted on November 2, 2010.

1846 births
1918 deaths
People from Avilés
19th-century Spanish businesspeople
History of Patagonia
20th-century Spanish businesspeople